The age limitations for many of the Cadet and Junior World Championships are no longer easily ascertainable, and in many cases the ages listed below are unverified estimates.  There were two Junior World Championships held in 1979 and 1980.

In the lists below, champions whose names are colored in gold, silver, or bronze went also won the corresponding senior-level medal at the World Championships or Olympic Games in Greco-Roman wrestling.  Champions colored blue also represented their country at the senior level in the World Championships or Olympic Games in Greco-Roman wrestling.

List of 15 and Under World Champions in Men's Greco-Roman Wrestling

Cadet Worlds, 1980 (15 and under)

Cadet Worlds, 1983 (15 and under)

List of 16 and Under World Champions in Men's Greco-Roman Wrestling

Cadet Worlds, 1987-1996 (16 and under)

List of 17 and Under World Champions in Men's Greco-Roman Wrestling

Cadet Worlds, 1997-1998 (17 and under)

Cadet Worlds, 1999 (17 and under)

Youth Olympic Games, 2010 (17 and Under)

Cadet Worlds, 2011–2013 (17 and under)

Youth Olympic Games, 2014 (17 and Under)

Cadet Worlds, 2014–2017 (17 and Under)

Youth Olympic Games, 2018 (17 and Under)

Cadet Worlds, 2018- (17 and Under)

List of 18 and Under World Champions in Men's Greco-Roman Wrestling

Junior Worlds, 1969 (18 and Under)

Junior Worlds, 1971 (18 and Under)

Junior Worlds, 1978 (18 and Under)

Junior Worlds, 1980 (18 and Under)

Junior Worlds, 1980(18 and Under)

Cadet Worlds, 1982 (18 and under)

Junior Worlds, 1983-1984 (18 and Under)

Junior Worlds, 1986 (18 and Under)

Junior Worlds, 1988–1995 (18 and Under)

List of 20 and Under World Champions in Men's Greco-Roman Wrestling

Junior Worlds, 1973–1977 (20 and Under)

Junior Worlds, 1979 (20 and Under)

Junior Worlds, 1981 (20 and Under)

Junior Worlds, 1982 (20 and Under)

Espoir Worlds, 1984-1995 (20 and Under)

Junior Worlds, 1997–1998 (20 and Under)

Junior Worlds, 1999–2001 (20 and Under)

Junior Worlds, 2002–2017 (20 and Under)

Junior Worlds, 2018– (20 and Under)

List of 23 and Under World Champions in Men's Greco-Roman Wrestling

U-23 Worlds, 2017

U-23 Worlds, 2018–

See also
 World Juniors Wrestling Championships
 List of World and Olympic Champions in Greco-Roman wrestling
 List of Cadet, Junior and U-23 World Champions in men's freestyle wrestling

References

FILA Database

Greco-Roman wrestling
Wrestling champions